The 2001 Australian Super Touring Car Series was a CAMS sanctioned motor racing competition open to Super Touring Cars. It was the ninth running of an Australian series for Super Touring Cars and the first to be contested under the Australian Super Touring Series name. The series, which was promoted as the '2001 Power Tour', began on 21 October 2001 at Winton Motor Raceway and ended on 25 November 2001 at Calder Park Raceway after two rounds.

Future Touring Cars
With Super Touring competitor numbers dropping after the withdrawal of the factory supported Audi and Volvo teams, the grids for the 2001 championship were bolstered with cars from the Future Touring Car category. This category, which catered for V8 powered cars that had competed previously in AUSCAR racing, made its debut in a support event to the 1999 Bathurst 500. While the Future Touring Cars and the Super Touring Cars raced together in the same events, drivers competed for two separate titles with separate points scoring for each category.

Teams and drivers
The following teams and drivers competed in the 2001 Australian Super Touring Championship.

Race Calendar
The 2001 Australian Super Touring Championship was contested over a two-round series, with two races held at each round.

Points system
Points were awarded on a 15-12-10-8-6-5-4-3-2-1 basis for the top ten race positions in each race. A bonus point was allocated for the fastest lap time set in each qualifying session.

Results

Drivers Championship

See also
 2001 Australian Touring Car season

References

External links
 2001 Racing Results Archive

Australian Super Touring Championship
Super Touring Car Championship